The 12th Congress of Deputies was a meeting of the Congress of Deputies, the lower house of the Spanish Cortes Generales, with the membership determined by the results of the 2016 general election held on 26 June 2016. The congress met for the first time on 19 July 2016 and was dissolved prematurely on 5 March 2019.

Election
The 12th Spanish general election was held on 26 June 2016. At the election the conservative People's Party remained the largest party in the Congress of Deputies but fell short of a majority.

History
The new congress met for the first time on 19 July  2016 and after two rounds of voting Ana Pastor (PP) was elected as President of the Congress of Deputies with the support of the Cs.

Other members of the Bureau of the Congress of Deputies were also elected on 19 July  2016: Ignacio Prendes (Cs), First Vice-President; Micaela Navarro (PSOE), Second Vice-President; Rosa Romero (PP), Third Vice-President; Gloria Elizo (Podemos), Fourth Vice-President; Alicia Sánchez-Camacho (PP), First Secretary; Juan Luis Gordo (PSOE), Second Secretary; Marcelo Expósito (ECP), Third Secretary; and Patricia Reyes (Cs), Fourth Secretary.

After a protracted government formation and four rounds of voting, Mariano Rajoy (PP) was re-elected Prime Minister with the support of the Cs on 29 October 2016 after the PSOE leadership chose to abstain.

In June 2017, following a series of corruption scandals involving the PP, Podemos submitted a motion of no confidence in Rajoy's government but on 14 June 2017 Congress rejected the motion after the PSOE leadership chose to abstain again.

In May 2018, following another corruption scandal involving the PP, PSOE submitted a motion of no confidence in Rajoy's government and on 1 June 2018 Congress approved the motion after Podemos and various separatist, nationalist and regionalist parties chose to support the motion. As a result of the vote PSOE leader Pedro Sánchez became Prime Minister.

After the PSOE government refused to discuss right to self-determination for Catalonia, Catalan separatists joined the PP and Cs in voting down the 2019 General State Budget on 13 February 2019. On 15 February 2019 Prime Minister Sánchez announced that a snap election would be held on 28 April 2019. The 12th Cortes Generales was formally dissolved on 5 March 2019.

Deaths, disqualifications and resignations
The 12th congress saw the following deaths, disqualifications and resignations:
 8 August 2016 - María Such (PSOE) resigned after being appointed director of the Valencian Institute of Women and Gender Equality. She was replaced by Ciprià Ciscar (PSOE) on 24 August 2016.
 22 August 2016 - Alejandro Ramírez (PP) died. He was replaced by Víctor Valentín Píriz (PP) on 29 August 2016.
 20 September 2016 - María del Puerto Gallego (PSOE) resigned after being indicted for prevarication. He was replaced by Ricardo Cortés (PSOE) on 22 September 2016.
 13 October 2016 - Domingo Lorenzo (Cs) resigned for personal reasons. He was replaced by María Sandra Juliá (Cs) on 17 October 2016.
 17 October 2016 - Alfonso Alonso (PP) resigned after being elected to the Basque Parliament. He was replaced by Javier Ignacio Maroto (PP) on 18 October 2016.
 29 October 2016 - Pedro Sánchez (POSE) resigned following an internal crisis in the PSOE. He was replaced by María Carlota Merchán (PSOE) on 15 November 2016.
 18 November 2016 - Irene Garrido (PP) resigned after being appointed Secretary of State for the Economy. She was replaced by Tomás Javier Fole (PP) on 22 November 2016.
 21 November 2016 - Matilde Asian (PP) and José Enrique Fernández (PP) resigned after being appointed Secretary of State for Tourism and Secretary of State for Finance respectively. They were replaced by Celia Alberto (PP) and Javier Calvente (PP) respectively on 22 November 2016.
 25 November 2016 - Tomás Burgos (PP), José Antonio Nieto (PP) and Juan María Vazquez (PP) resigned after being appointed Secretary of State for Social Security, Secretary of State for Security and Secretary of State for Science and Innovation respectively. They were replaced by Raquel Lourdes Alonso (PP), Isabel Cabezas (PP) and Francisco Javier Ruano (PP) respectively on 29 November 2016.
 28 November 2016 - Pedro Azpiazu (EAJ-PNV) resigned after being appointed Minister of Finance and Economy of the Basque Country. He was replaced by Idoia Sagastizabal (EAJ-PNV) on 13 December 2016.
 28 November 2016 - Eloísa Cabrera (PP) resigned to prioritise her position as a municipal councillor. She was replaced by María del Carmen Navarro (PP) on 29 November 2016.
 7 December 2016 - José María Lassalle (PP) resigned after being appointed Secretary of State for Information Society and Digital Agenda. He was replaced by Diego Movellán (PP) on 13 December 2016.
 9 February 2017 - Ángeles Isac (PP) resigned in order to prepare for the 2019 municipal elections. She was replaced by María Torres (PP) on 14 February 2017.
 29 March 2017 - Francesc Homs (PDeCAT) was disqualified for one year and one month by the Supreme Court for his role in the 2014 Catalan self-determination referendum. He was replaced by Feliu-Joan Guillaumes (PDeCAT) on 5 April 2017.
 31 August 2017 - Antonio Trevín (PSOE) resigned following political disagreement with the PSOE leadership. He was replaced by Natalia González (PSOE) on 12 September 2017.
 4 September 2017 - Eduardo Madina (PSOE) resigned following political disagreement with the PSOE leadership. He was replaced by José Enrique Serrano (PSOE) on 12 September 2017.
 18 September 2017 - Carmen Álvarez-Arenas (PP) resigned following a scandal relating to non-declaration of income. She was replaced by Pilar Marcos (PP) on 19 September 2017.
 9 November 2017 - Francisco Bernabé (PP) resigned after being appointed the national government's delegate in Murcia. He was replaced by María Dolores Bolarín (PP) on 14 November 2017.
 14 November 2017 - Julián López (PSOE) resigned after being appointed Director-General of Analysis, Public Policies and Co-ordination of the Presidency of the Generalitat Valenciana. He was replaced by Herick Campos (PSOE) on 14 November 2017.
 28 December 2017 - Jorge Moragas (PP) resigned after being appointed Spain's Permanent Representative to the United Nations. He was replaced by Ángeles Esteller (PP) on 6 February 2018.
 17 January 2018 - Xavier Domènech (ECP) resigned after being elected to the Parliament of Catalonia. He was replaced by Alicia Ramos (ECP) on 6 February 2018.
 1 June 2018 - Ester Capella (ERC–CatSí) and Teresa Jordà (ERC–CatSí) resigned after being appointed Minister of Justice and Minister of Agriculture, Livestock, Fisheries and Food of Catalonia respectively. They were replaced by Carolina Telechea (ERC–CatSí) and Joan Margall (ERC–CatSí) respectively on 12 June 2018.
 15 June 2018 - José Luis Ábalos (PSOE), Meritxell Batet (PSOE) and Margarita Robles (PSOE) resigned after being appointed Minister of Public Works, Minister of Territorial Policy and Civil Service and Minister of Defence respectively. They were replaced by Alicia Piquer (PSOE), Mohammed Chaib (PSOE) and Gema López (PSOE) respectively on 19 June 2018.
 15 June 2018 - Mariano Rajoy (PP) retired from politics after being ousted as Prime Minister. He was replaced by Valentina Martínez (PP) on 19 June 2018.
 19 June 2018 - Manuel Gabriel González (PSOE) resigned after being appointed the national government's delegate in Castilla–La Mancha. He was replaced by Soledad Amada Velasco (PSOE) on 26 June 2018.
 20 June 2018 - Ana Botella (PSOE) resigned after being appointed Secretary of State for Security. She was replaced by Antonio Quintana (PSOE) on 26 June 2018.
 22 June 2018 - Pedro Saura (PSOE) resigned after being appointed Secretary of State for Infrastructure. He was replaced by Carmen Baños (PSOE) on 2 July 2018.
 29 June 2018 - Ignacio Sánchez (PSOE) resigned after being appointed Secretary of State for Territorial Policy. He was replaced by Patricia Sierra (PSOE) on 2 July 2018.
 29 June 2018 - Pablo Matos (PP) resigned after being appointed to the Canary Islands Advisory Council. He was replaced by Manuel Luis Torres (PP) on 2 July 2018.
 10 September 2018 - Soraya Sáenz de Santamaría (PP) retired from politics. She was replaced by Mariano Pérez-Hickman (PP) on 11 September 2018.
 14 November 2018 - María Dolores de Cospedal (PP) resigned following a scandal. She was replaced by Francisco Vañó (PP) on 20 November 2018.
 26 December 2018 - Alfonso Candón (PP) resigned after being elected to the Parliament of Andalusia. He was replaced by Andrés Núñez (PP) on 22 January 2019.
 21 January 2019 - Íñigo Errejón (UP) resigned following an internal crisis in Podemos. He was replaced by Sol Sánchez (Podemos) on 22 January 2019.
 11 February 2019 - Juan Bravo (PP) resigned after being appointed Minister of Finance, Industry and Energy of Andalusia. He was replaced by Kissy Chandiramani (PP) on 12 February 2019.
 15 February 2019 - Maria Rosa Martínez (UP) resigned after becoming the Elkarrekin Podemos's co-ordinator in the Basque Parliament. She was replaced by María Carmen Iglesias (UP) on 19 February 2019.
 21 February 2019 - Rafael Merino (PP) resigned after being appointed director of the Public Agency of Ports of Andalusia. He was replaced by Manuel Torres (PP) on 21 February 2019.
 22 February 2019 - Teófila Martínez (PP) resigned after being appointed president of the Port Authority of Cadiz. She was replaced by José Ignacio Romaní (PP) on 26 February 2019.

Members

Notes

References
 
 

2016 establishments in Spain
2019 disestablishments in Spain
Congress of Deputies (Spain)